The 2015–16 season was the 114th season of competitive football in Italy.

Promotions and relegations (pre-season)
Teams promoted to Serie A
 Carpi
 Frosinone
 Bologna

Teams relegated from Serie A
 Cagliari
 Cesena
 Parma

Teams promoted to Serie B
 Novara
 Teramo
 Salernitana
 Como

Teams relegated from Serie B
 Catania
 Cittadella
 Brescia
 Varese

National teams

Italy national football team

UEFA Euro 2016 qualifying

Friendlies

League season

Serie A

Serie B

Lega Pro

Serie D

Cup competitions

Supercoppa Italiana

Coppa Italia

References 

 
Seasons in Italian football

2015 in Italian sport
2015 in association football
2016 in Italian sport
2016 in association football